The 1973 Brisbane Rugby League season was the 65th season of the Brisbane Rugby League premiership. Eight teams from across Brisbane competed for the premiership, which culminated in Fortitude Valley defeating Redcliffe 15–7 in the grand final.

Season summary 
Teams played each other three times, with 21 rounds of competition played. It resulted in a top four of Fortitude Valley, Eastern Suburbs, Northern Suburbs and Redcliffe.

Ladder

Finals 

Source:

References

Rugby league in Brisbane
1973 in Australian rugby league
1973 in rugby league